Horní Libochová is a municipality and village in Žďár nad Sázavou District in the Vysočina Region of the Czech Republic. It has about 200 inhabitants.

Administrative parts
Hamlets of Dolní Hlíny and Horní Hlíny are administrative parts of Horní Libochová.

References

Villages in Žďár nad Sázavou District